Wanzhi District is a district in Wuhu City, in the southeast of Anhui Province, China.

Wanzhi District is established from being revoked of Wuhu County in 2020.

Administrative divisions
Wanzhi District is divided to 5 towns and 1 other.
5 Towns
 Wanzhi
 Liulang
 Taoxin
 Hongyang
 Huaqiao

1 Other
 Anhui Xinwu Economic Development Zone

Climate

Transportation
Wanzhi District is served by Wanzhi South railway station on the Shangqiu–Hangzhou high-speed railway.

Wuhu Xuanzhou Airport in Wanzhi District opened on April 30, 2021.

References

Wuhu